"Wanna Lick" was announced as the first promotion single from G-Unit's second studio album, T.O.S: Terminate on Sight. The track did not appear on T.O.S because it was replaced with 'I Like The Way She Do It'. the song is now considered a promo single for Lil' Kim's Mixtape, Ms. G.O.A.T.

Background 
The song only features 50 Cent and Lil' Kim with Tony Yayo providing minor background effects.  The track has been dubbed the second version of "Magic Stick" and was made possible due to Young Buck bringing 50 Cent and Lil' Kim together to reconcile after a feud was started shortly after "Magic Stick" was released in 2003.  The producer of the track was unknown until J. Armz released "How To Be An MC Vol. 48", where the producer of "Wanna Lick" was listed as Biggz Da Butcher. The single made its premiere via Hot 97 when Funkmaster Flex aired the track on October 19, 2007.

Track listing 

US Promo Vinyl
"Wanna Lick" (Dirty) - 3:38
"Wanna Lick" (Clean Extended) - 4:26
"Wanna Lick" (Instrumental) - 2:25
"Wanna Lick" (Radio) 3:38

References 

2007 songs
G-Unit songs
Lil' Kim songs
Dirty rap songs
Songs written by Lil' Kim
Songs written by 50 Cent